The Arrows A7 was a Formula One car which the Arrows team used to compete in the 1984 Formula One season. The car made its debut at the 1984 Belgian Grand Prix held that year at Zolder. Driven by versatile Swiss fast man Marc Surer and Belgian Thierry Boutsen, the A7 scored only 3 points when Boutsen and Surer finished 5th and 6th respectively in the 1984 Austrian Grand Prix.

The A7 was the team's first time running a turbocharged engine. This was the same powerful BMW M12 Straight 4 which was also used by the Brabham team, though unlike Brabham who had BMW engineers looking after their engines, the Arrows engines were maintained and developed by Swiss engine guru Heini Mader. This left Arrows with around  while the factory units were developing around

Complete Formula One results
(key)

References

A07